

291001–291100 

|-bgcolor=#f2f2f2
| colspan=4 align=center | 
|}

291101–291200 

|-bgcolor=#f2f2f2
| colspan=4 align=center | 
|}

291201–291300 

|-bgcolor=#f2f2f2
| colspan=4 align=center | 
|}

291301–291400 

|-id=325
| 291325 de Tyard ||  || Pontus de Tyard (c. 1521–1605), a French poet and priest, and a member of La Pléiade, a group of seven humanist poets. || 
|-id=387
| 291387 Katiebouman ||  || Katie Bouman (born 1989) is an American engineer and computer scientist. Bouman led development of an algorithm that made the first direct image of a black hole possible via the Event Horizon Telescope array. || 
|}

291401–291500 

|-bgcolor=#f2f2f2
| colspan=4 align=center | 
|}

291501–291600 

|-bgcolor=#f2f2f2
| colspan=4 align=center | 
|}

291601–291700 

|-id=633
| 291633 Heyun ||  || He Yun (born 1921), a Chinese radio/TV engineer and the chief designer of the old Shanghai TV Tower. He is also a veteran amateur astronomer, who has been active in the greater Shanghai region for decades. || 
|}

291701–291800 

|-bgcolor=#f2f2f2
| colspan=4 align=center | 
|}

291801–291900 

|-id=847
| 291847 Ladoix ||  || Ladoix, a French village situated north of Beaune, in the Burgundy vineyard region || 
|-id=849
| 291849 Orchestralondon ||  || Orchestra London Canada, a 1937-founded professional Canadian symphony orchestra in London, Ontario || 
|-id=855
| 291855 Calabròcorrado ||  || Corrado Calabrò (born 1935) is an Italian poet who has regenerated contemporary poetry opening it dream-like to science. His poem Roaming tells of a large asteroid that strikes the Moon causing the Earth to wobble. || 
|}

291901–292000 

|-id=923
| 291923 Kuzmaskryabin ||  || Andriy Kuzmenko (1968–2015), known as "Kuzma", was a Ukrainian poet, composer, TV-showman and lead singer of the band Skryabin, who died in a car accident || 
|}

References 

291001-292000